The Mongolia national badminton team represents Mongolia in international badminton team competitions. It is controlled by the Mongolian Badminton Association (Mongolian: Монголын Бадминтоны Холбоо; Mongolian script:  ᠮᠣᠩᠭᠣᠯ ᠤᠨ ᠪᠠᠳᠮᠢᠨᠲ᠋ᠣᠨ ᠤ ᠬᠣᠯᠪᠣᠭ᠎ᠠ). Although badminton is not a popular in the country, the Mongolian team have competed twice in the Sudirman Cup, in 2005 and 2009. 

The Mongolian badminton team also competed in the now defunct East Asian Games.

Participation in BWF competitions

Sudirman Cup

Participation in East Asian Games 
The Mongolian badminton team competed in the East Asian Games badminton mixed team event. In all four editions, the Mongolian team were eliminated in the quarterfinals and have never medaled at the East Asian Games.

Squad 

Men
Gerelsukh Jargalsaikhan
Batdavaa Munkhbat
Purevsuren Enkhmandakh
Olonbayar Enkhbat
Battur Davaasuren
Khuvituguldur Byambajav
Tuguldur Boldbaatar

Women
Bat-Ochir Davharbayar
Munkhbayr Bolor-Uyanga
Uurtsaikh Erkhembayar
Itgelbayar Galbadrakh
Dashdondov Bulgamaa
Saikhantuul Banzragch
Olzvoi Janchiv

References

Badminton
National badminton teams
Badminton in Mongolia